Phosphatidylinositol N-acetylglucosaminyltransferase subunit C is an enzyme that in humans is encoded by the PIGC gene.

This gene encodes an endoplasmic reticulum associated protein that is involved in glycosylphosphatidylinositol (GPI) lipid anchor biosynthesis. The GPI lipid anchor is a glycolipid found on many blood cells and serves to anchor proteins to the cell surface. The encoded protein is one subunit of the GPI N-acetylglucosaminyl (GlcNAc) transferase that transfers GlcNAc to phosphatidylinositol (PI) on the cytoplasmic side of the endoplasmic reticulum. Two alternatively spliced transcripts that encode the same protein have been found for this gene. A pseudogene on chromosome 11 has also been characterized.

Interactions
PIGC has been shown to interact with PIGQ.

References

Further reading